James John Donegan (born 30 January 1917) is an Irish former hurler who played as a goalkeeper for the Dublin and Kilkenny senior teams.

Born in Kilkenny, Donegan first arrived on the inter-county scene when he first linked up with the Dublin senior team, making his debut in the 1942 championship. He later joined the Kilkenny senior team. During his career he won one All-Ireland medal and four Leinster medals.

Donegan also represented the Leinster inter-provincial team, however, he never won a Railway Cup medal. At club level he won one championship medal with Tullaroan.

Honours

Team

Tullaroan
Kilkenny Senior Hurling Championship (1): 1948

Dublin
Leinster Senior Hurling Championship (2): 1942, 1944

Kilkenny
All-Ireland Senior Hurling Championship (1): 1947
Leinster Senior Hurling Championship (2): 1946 1947

References

1917 births
Possibly living people
St Oliver Plunketts/Eoghan Ruadh hurlers
Dublin inter-county hurlers
Kilkenny inter-county hurlers
Leinster inter-provincial hurlers
All-Ireland Senior Hurling Championship winners